General Mackay may refer to:

Alexander Mackay (British Army officer) (1717–1789), British Army lieutenant general
Andrew Mackay (British Army officer) (fl. 1980s–2000s), British Army major general
Hugh Mackay (general) (c. 1640–1692), Dutch Scots Brigade lieutenant general
Iven Mackay (1882–1966), Australian Army lieutenant general
Kenneth Mackay (Australian politician) (1859–1935), Australian Army Reserve major general

See also
Iain Mackay-Dick (born 1945), British Army major general